June Mountain ski area is a winter resort in the eastern Sierra Nevada of California, located near June Lake, southeast of Yosemite National Park.

June Mountain, like its neighbor and current owner, Mammoth Mountain Ski Area, has traditionally been popular with skiers from Southern California, in part because of its relative ease of automobile access in winter compared to the Lake Tahoe resorts, which are traditionally more accessible to Northern California residents. It is also popular with locals, elementary and high school ski programs, and race teams in the surrounding small towns of Mono County, many of whom depend on the resort for a substantial portion of their winter tourism base.

June Mountain hosted the 2006 Ski Mountaineering Race Series and the ski and snowboard portions of the 2006 California Winter Games in March 2006.

June Mountain also offers chair lift rides to the chalet throughout the summer and contains hiking trails and other scenic features that are accessible throughout the summer months.

On June 21, 2012, Mammoth Mountain and the Starwood Capital Group announced that they would close June Mountain for the summer and winter 2012–2013 season, after 50 years of continuous operation.  An active citizen movement arose in response, raising concerns about the prospects for sustaining the local community if the mountain closed. With a new strategy to finally invest in snowmaking, a chairlift, and marketing, June Mountain re-opened for the 2013–2014 season.

In 2014, Mammoth Mountain purchased Bear Mountain and Snow Summit for $38 million. In 2017, Mammoth Resorts announced its sale by Starwood to a partnership of Aspen Skiing Company and KSL Capital Partners, later named Alterra Mountain Company.

Lifts and Trails

June Mountain operates 7 ski lifts, 2 high-speed quads, 4 doubles, and 1 people mover for beginners. In 1996, Doppelmayr retrofitted the two high-speed quads, introducing new grips and other technological improvements. Most of the double chairlifts were built by Riblet and retrofitted by Lift Engineering (Yan Lifts). Chair J1, a double chair, carries skiers and snowboarders from the lower ticket office up to June Meadows Chalet where most amenities the resort has to offer are located. From the chalet, riders can either head down the challenging front face of the resort back to the lower ticket office and parking lot or continue to the more intermediate upper mountain. Chair J6, a high speed quad lift, provides direct access to the top of Rainbow Mountain and a variety of intermediate runs. The other lift option from the chalet is chair J2 which leads to Stew Pot Slims, where food and beverages are available, and gives skiers and snowboarders access to the smaller of the two terrain parks on the mountain as well the 22 foot superpipe. From the top of chair J2, chair J4, and chair J7. Chair J4 also leads to the summit of Rainbow Mountain while chair J7 goes to the top of June Mountain and provides access to some of the more iconic runs on the mountain in addition to the largest terrain park found in the resort. The total uphill capacity of the lifts at June Mountain is 10,000 rides per hour.

Main Lifts:

Removed Lifts

Mountains

June Mountain ski area consists of two mountains, Rainbow Mountain, with an elevation of 10,040 feet (3,060 m), and June Mountain, with a peak of 10,090 feet (3,075 m). The total vertical rise from the lower ticket office to the summit of June Mountain is 2,545 feet. June Mountain averages 250 inches of snowfall a year along with some snowmaking capabilities and normal season runs from December through April. The ski area covers 1,500 acres and has 35 named trails of which 20% are advanced, 45% are intermediate, and 35% are beginner. June Mountain is also home to two terrain parks and a 22-foot superpipe. Many opportunities exist, however, for riders to explore the trees that cover much of the ski areas total acreage and access fresh snow off piste. June Mountain has also established itself as a favorite spot among locals due to its small crowds and easy access to powder following a storm.

Backcountry

The lifts at June Mountain Ski Resort also give riders access to multiple backcountry ski locations that would normally require an all day hike to reach. Examples of these backcountry zones are San Joaquin Ridge, the Negatives, Fern Creek, Carson Peak, Devil's Slide, and Four Seasons. Due to the location of the resort, 5,000 foot descents are easily available with only 2,000 feet of ascending by skis. Because of this and the variety of backcountry terrain found in the immediate proximity of the resort, June Mountain is considered to have some of the best lift accessed backcountry in the West.

Services

Most of the mountain's services are found at June Meadows chalet, at the top of chair J1. Services include a restaurant and a renowned bar. It is also the home of the ski school, a general merchandise shop, and a ski shop, supplying skis, snowboards, and their requirements. Another restaurant on the mountain, "Stew Pots Slim's", located at the base of chair J7, is popular with more advanced skiers, for its location next to the terrain parks and June Mountain's many advanced runs. It serves drinks, sandwiches, soups and chili.

Other

June Mountain has some snowmaking, but it is rarely used, for the mountain averages about 250 inches (6.4 m) of snowfall per year. It also has a small grooming fleet for the terrain park and trails. June Mountain used to be home to the QMC, or Quad Monocable Tramway, a type of gondola similar to a funitel or funifor. It was built by Yan Lifts (Lift Engineering), but was removed in 1996 due to technical problems. It was bought by Dave McCoy in 1986, owner of Mammoth Mountain. The ski resort is now owned by Mammoth Mountain Ski resort.

References

External links
 June Mountain official website
 June mountain stats
 Skilifts.org
 Skiresort.info test report

Alterra Mountain Company
Ski areas and resorts in California
Companies based in Mono County, California
Buildings and structures in Mono County, California
Tourist attractions in Mono County, California